Tontemboan is an Austronesian language, of northern Sulawesi, Indonesia. It is a Minahasan language, a sub-group of the Philippine languages.

Name and dialects 
Other names and dialect names are: Makela'i-Maotow, Makelai, Matana'i-Maore', Matanai, Pakewa, Kumawangkoan, Tompakewa, Tumompaso, Sonder, and Tountemboan.

Usage 
As of 2013, an estimated 100,000 people speak the language, but it is not being passed on to children. It is used in the areas of Sonder, Kawangkoan, Tompaso, Langowan, Tumpaan, Suluun, Amurang, Kumelembuai, Motoling, Tompaso Baru, and Modoinding. Documentation of the language assembled by missionaries in the early 20th century is relatively inaccessible to Tontemboan speakers, as it is written in the Dutch language.

In 1907, Firma P.W.M Trap, Leiden, Holland published a Bible in the Tontemboan language. It was edited by Maria Lamberta Adriani-Gunning and Johannis Regar.

Vocabulary

References

Sources

External links 
OLAC resources in and about the Tontemboan language
Tontemboan Gospel of Mark
The Tower of Babel (Genesis 11: 1–9)

Languages of Sulawesi
Minahasan languages